Māhukona  is a submerged shield volcano on the northwestern flank of the Island of Hawaii. A drowned coral reef at about 3,770 feet (-1,150 m) below sea level and a major break in slope at about 4,400 feet (-1,340 m) below sea level represent old shorelines. 

A roughly circular caldera marks its summit. A prominent rift zone extends to the west. A second rift zone probably extended to the east but has been buried by younger volcanoes. 

The main shield-building stage of volcanism ended about 470,000 years ago. The summit of the shield volcano was once 800 feet (250 m) above sea level, but subsided below sea level between 435,000 and 365,000 years ago. 

Māhukona is the oldest volcano to build Hawaii island, older than Kohala and Mauna Kea.  

The Monterey Bay Aquarium Research Institute investigated the area with a remotely controlled submarine in 2001.

It was named for the area known as Māhukona, on the shore to the northeast.

References

Further reading

External links
 

Volcanoes of Hawaii
Hawaiian–Emperor seamount chain
Shield volcanoes of the United States
Hotspot volcanoes
Extinct volcanoes
Polygenetic shield volcanoes
Pleistocene shield volcanoes
Pleistocene Oceania
Cenozoic Hawaii
Calderas of Hawaii